Chabua (IPA:  or ) is a town and a town area committee in Dibrugarh district in the state of Assam, India. Chabua is situated in between Dibrugarh town and Tinsukia town on NH-37  from both the district towns, respectively. Its name derives from Chah (tea) and bua (plantation).It also known as the motherland of tea, because first time in asia tea was planted in chabua.

Geography
It has an average elevation of 106 metres (347 feet).

Demographics
 India census, Chabua had a population of 7,230. Males constitute 51% of the population and females 49%. Chabua has an average literacy rate of 88%, higher than the national average of 59.5%; with male literacy of 83% and female literacy of 72%. 11% of the population is under 6 years of age.

Politics
Chabua is a Legislative Assembly constituency and a Circle of Dibrugarh District.
Chabua is part of Lakhimpur.

History
In the early 1820s, the British East India Company began large-scale production of tea in Assam, India, of a tea variety traditionally brewed by the Singpho tribe. In 1826, the British East India Company took over the region from the Ahom kings through the Yandaboo Treaty. In 1837, the first English tea garden was established at Chabua in Upper Assam; in 1840, the Assam Tea Company began the commercial production of tea in the region, run by indentured servitude of the local inhabitants. Beginning in the 1850s, the tea industry rapidly expanded, consuming vast tracts of land for tea plantations. By the turn of the century, Assam became the leading tea-producing region in the world. The word Chabua consist of two words: chah which means "tea" and bua which means plantation. Later on, Chahbua became Chabua and the place got its name.

During World War II, Chabua Air Force Station was constructed on the outskirts of the town.  Chabua airfield was one of the largest bases used by the USAAF Air Transport Command to ferry supplies and personnel across The Hump to China in World War II. Chabua was headquarters for both the Assam and Bengal Wings of the India-China Division, ATC; and the operating base for the flying squadron of the 1333rd AAF Base Unit.

The country's eastern sector bordering China got fortified on 8 March 2011, with the induction of the Sukhoi Su-30MKI fighter aircraft at the Chabua Air Force Station. The initiation was done through a symbolic ceremony with the inaugural flight of the Sukhoi Su-30MKI taking off from here. It also performed an overshoot before landing. Chabua is the second airbase in the northeast after Tezpur to house the Sukhois, capable of striking targets inside China with a cruising speed range of 3,200 km, which can be more than doubled with mid-air refuelling by IL-78 aircraft.

Education and research
Chabua has many educational institutions:  
University:
Sri Sri Aniruddhadeva Sports University
Colleges:
 Dakha Devi Rasiwasia College
 Chabua Junior College, Chabua
 Purvajyoti Academy
 Kendriya Vidyalaya A.F.S Chabua
Vocational Training:
 NEEI, Chabua
Basic Teachers Training Centre

Schools:
 Assam Vidyapith H.S. School
 Jatiya Vidyalay, Chabua
 Little Angel School, Chabua  
 Montfort High school, Chabua
 Rashtriya Hindi Vidyalaya HE School, est. 1952
 Bastuhara Vidyalaya H.E School
 Dinjoy H.M.H.S. School
 Paragon M.G Academy, Chabua
 Kendriya vidyalaya A.F.S Chabua
Health & Medical services
 Referral Hospital & Research Centre 
 ST. Lukes Hospital
 Rural Health & Training Centre, Chabua, supervised by Assam Medical College
 Model hospital Chabua

Notable people
Birthplace of Julie Christie, actress (b. 1940) in St. Luke's Hospital, Chabua. Her father was the manager of Singlijan Tea Estate 
Sarbananda Sonowal former CM of Assam

IPS J.N. Choudhury former DGP of Assam.

IPS Karuna Kanta Das, ADGP.

Paresh baruah (ULFA) Chairman.

Punakan Boruah Present MLA Chabua .

References

Cities and towns in Dibrugarh district
Dibrugarh